This Time is an album by American country music artist Waylon Jennings, released on RCA Victor in 1974, at the peak of the outlaw country movement. It was produced by Jennings and Willie Nelson.

Recording
Although Jennings had won artistic autonomy from RCA in 1972, giving him the freedom to produce his own records, he was still irritated by RCA executives, who kept a close eye on his recording sessions at RCA Victor Studios and had even delayed the release of his 1973 album Honky Tonk Heroes.  In his autobiography, Jennings wrote that although he had agreed to record in their studios, the RCA engineers were constantly calling upstairs to executive Jerry Bradley, keeping him aware of everything Jennings did.  Fed up with the aggravation, Jennings decided to record his next album at Tompall Glaser's studio at 916 Nineteenth Avenue South, nicknamed "Hillbilly Central," with Willie Nelson co-producing.  Glaser, a Nashville veteran who had achieved fame with the Glaser Brothers,  had co-produced Honky Tonk Heroes, a touchstone of the outlaw country movement.  In his book Outlaw: Waylon, Willie, Kris, and the Renegades of Nashville, author Michael Striessguth describes the atmosphere at the studio, which contrasted sharply with RCA's strict recording traditions:

"Its doors propped open to let in the young breezes sweeping through the West End, the so-called Hillbilly Central offices became an outlaw safe haven.  Former employees recalled Willie Nelson lazing on the front lawn, and Waylon haunting the offices at three in the morning...The studio hosted a fraternity of singers, songwriters and Nashville dropouts living the verse of a strumming and bumming honky tonk song...Sessions burned into the small hours until Tompall and his entourage peeled out into the streets in search of pinball machines, drinks, and greasy food."
  
According to Streissguth, the first song Jennings recorded at Glaser's studio in October 1973 was J.J. Cale's "Louisiana Women" with Kyle Lehning engineering.  Lehning, who would achieve fame in the 1980s producing albums for Randy Travis, contributed Wurlitzer electric piano to the Cale song and the trumpet part to "Heaven and Hell."  "You just can't believe how different everything sounded when he moved from RCA," Glaser explained in the 2003 documentary Beyond Nashville.  "The bottom was fat and big again...You could hear the drum, it wasn't a little tick in the back.  It was marvellous."  Jennings agreed, stating, "There was a freedom there that I didn't have any place else.  Both of us could experiment...It was a fraternity, and Nashville was our college town."

Composition
Overall, This Time has a more laid-back feel than its defiant predecessor.  Four of the twelve songs on the LP were written by Nelson and included on his Phases and Stages concept album, which was released earlier that same year.  Nelson also sang on "Heaven and Hell" and contributed guitar to the album.  The title track became Jennings' first chart-topping smash in June 1974.  In the authorized video biography Renegade Outlaw Legend, the singer revealed, "I wrote that song five years before and whoever was producing me then at RCA said it was no good.  I was going through some old tapes and happened to find it."  Jennings added that he wanted to throw the song away but was persuaded not to by drummer Ritchie Albright.  The album also marked the first time Jennings recorded a song written by Miriam Eddy, the ex-wife of producer Duane Eddy, who later changed her name to Jessi Colter and became Waylon's wife.  Playing up to his outlaw personae, Jennings recorded the aptly titled "Slow Movin' Outlaw" and also included Texan songwriter Billy Joe Shaver's "Slow Rollin' Low."

This Time was reissued in 1999 with five bonus tracks featuring several songs famously sung by Buddy Holly. Produced by Rock and Roll Hall of Famer Duane Eddy, these tracks feature The Crickets, Holly's backing band, as musicians and backing vocalists.

Reception
This Time peaked at #4 on the Billboard country albums chart, his best showing there since 1967.  Stephen Thomas Erlewine of AllMusic writes, "It's not that the monochromaticity makes it a lesser affair than its predecessor, yet the whole thing does feel a bit reserved and not quite as overpowering as a sequel to Honky Tonk Heroes should be. Still, it's a first-rate record - perhaps not a classic, but a subdued, understated album unlike anything in his catalog."

Track listing
"This Time" (Waylon Jennings) – 2:26
"Louisiana Women" (J.J. Cale) – 4:03
"Pick Up the Tempo" (Willie Nelson) – 2:33
"Slow Rollin' Low" (Billy Joe Shaver) – 2:45
"Heaven or Hell" (Nelson) – 1:39
"It's Not Supposed to Be That Way" (Nelson) – 3:29
"Slow Movin' Outlaw" (Dee Moeller) – 3:41
"Mona" (Jessi Colter) – 2:48
"Walkin'" (Nelson) – 2:28
"If You Could Touch Her at All" (Lee Clayton) – 3:03

Bonus tracks
"That'll Be the Day" (Jerry Allison, Buddy Holly, Norman Petty) – 2:25
"It Doesn't Matter Anymore" (Paul Anka) – 2:56
"Lady in the Harbor" (Allison, Sonny Curtis, Doug Gilmore, Jennings) – 3:42
"Medley: Well All Right/It's So Easy/Maybe Baby/Peggy Sue" (Allison, Holly, Petty, Joe Mauldin) – 6:07
"If You're Goin' Girl" (Bobby Bond) – 3:45

Personnel

Duke Goff - bass
Richie Albright - drums
Don Brooks - harmonica
Reggie Young - lead guitar
Jessi Colter - piano, organ
Dee Moeller - piano, organ
Kyle Lehning - piano, organ, trumpet
Waylon Jennings - producer, arranger, rhythm and lead guitar
Willie Nelson - producer, lead guitar 
Larry Whitmore - rhythm guitar
Fred Newell - rhythm and lead guitar
Ralph Mooney - steel guitar, dobro
Herb Burnette - art direction

Charts

Weekly charts

Year-end charts

References

Waylon Jennings albums
1974 albums
RCA Records albums